Ulysses Tholus is a Martian volcano. It is located in the Tharsis quadrangle at  2.89° north latitude and 121.55° west longitude. It is 58 km across and is named after a classical albedo feature. Ulysses Tholus is immediately east and slightly north of another volcano, Biblis Tholus. The name of the mountain itself was changed on September 19, 2007. The former terminology, Ulysses Patera, now applies only (and more accurately) to the central caldera, whereas formerly it had applied to the whole edifice. Tholus describes a volcanic edifice somewhat smaller than would be implied by mons.

References

See also

 HiRISE
 Geology of Mars
 List of mountains on Mars by height
 Volcanoes on Mars
 Volcanology of Mars

Volcanoes of Mars
Tharsis quadrangle